Carmen Rosa Caso Sierra (born November 29, 1981 in Santo Domingo) is a retired volleyball player from the Dominican Republic, who won the bronze medal with the Dominican women's national team at the 2007 NORCECA Championship. She also became "Best Libero" of the event.

Career
At the volleyball tournament during the 2006 Central American and Caribbean Games, she won the "Best Libero" award and the gold medal.

She became the "Best Defender" of the 2006 TV Azteca’s Women Stars Volleyball Cup, played in Monterrey, Mexico and won by the team with a perfect record in 5 matches.

At the 2007 Pan-American Cup she took the bronze medal with the National Team and also the "Best Libero" award. Later that year, she won this same award at the 2007 NORCECA Championship.

Rosa joined Mirador to play the 2011 FIVB Women's Club World Championship, and her team finished in 4th place after losing the Bronze Medal match to the Brazilian team Sollys/Nestle.

Clubs
 Arlenis Cordero (-2004)
 Mirador (2005–2006)
 Distrito Nacional (2007–2010)
 Mirador (2010–2011)

Awards

Individuals
 2006 Central American and Caribbean Games "Best Libero" 
 2006 TV Azteca’s Women Stars Volleyball Cup "Best Receiver"
 2006 TV Azteca’s Women Stars Volleyball Cup "Best Defender"
 2007 Pan-American Cup "Best Libero"
 2007 NORCECA Championship "Best Libero"
 2007 Pan-American Games "Best Libero"
 2008 Dominican Volleyball League "Best Libero"

External links
 FIVB biography

References

1981 births
Living people
Dominican Republic women's volleyball players
Volleyball players at the 2007 Pan American Games
Central American and Caribbean Games gold medalists for the Dominican Republic
Competitors at the 2006 Central American and Caribbean Games
Liberos
Central American and Caribbean Games medalists in volleyball
Pan American Games competitors for the Dominican Republic